Tim Taylor is a Missouri politician serving as a member of the Missouri House of Representatives in the 48th district.

Missouri House of Representatives

Committee assignments 
 Conservation and Natural Resources
 Public Safety
 Transportation
 Veterans

Electoral history

References

Republican Party members of the Missouri House of Representatives
Living people
Year of birth missing (living people)